Poshteh Kolah (also Romanized as Poshteh Kolāh; also known as Poshteh Kolā, Posht Kolā, Posht Kolāh, Posht Qal‘eh, Pusht-Kala, and Pusht Qal‘eh) is a village in Khorgam Rural District, Khorgam District, Rudbar County, Gilan Province, Iran. At the 2006 census, its population was 532, in 141 families.

References 

Populated places in Rudbar County